For All the Drugs in the World is the fourth studio album by the band Sponge, their first release through Idol Records.  The album marked a major change in the group lineup, with the only remaining original members being vocalist Vinnie Dombroski and guitarist Joey Mazzola.

Track listing
All songs written by Vinnie Dombroski and Joey Mazzola except where noted.

Band members
 Vinnie Dombroski - vocals
 Joey Mazzola - guitar
 Billy Adams - drums
 Tim Krukowski - bass
 Kurt Marschke - guitar

Additional personnel
 John Mathiason - management
 Mike Rand - Booking agent (Ashley Talent International)
 Gary Malerba - cover photography
 Mark Arminski - cover art and design
 Pablo Mathiason - A&R assistance
 Roscoe - mixing on Tracks 1, 3-8 and 10-12
 Al Sutton - mixing on "Leave This World" and "Punch in the Nose"
 Eric Hoegemeyer - programming on "Leave This World"
 Howie Weinberg & Tim Pak - mastering
 Shelia Taylor - website support

Additional musicians
 Chris Codish - piano and B-3
 John Dunn - bass on "Love & Roses"
 Mimi Marjieh - backing vocals on "Burn"
 Vivian George - backing vocals on "Burn"

References

2003 albums
Sponge (band) albums